Nikola Mitrevski (Macedonian: Никола Митревски; born 3 October 1985) is a Macedonian handball player who plays for FC Porto and the National team of North Macedonia.

Honours
Vardar 
Macedonian Super League: 2008–09
Macedonia Cup: 2007–08

Metalurg 
Macedonian Super League: 2010–11, 2011–12, 2013–14
Macedonia Cup: 2010–11, 2012–13

Benfica
Portuguese Cup: 2015–16
Portuguese Super Cup: 2016

HCD SUD Constanta
Cupa României: 2017–18
Supercupa României: 2017

Porto
Portuguese League: 2020–21
Portuguese Cup: 2020–21
Portuguese Super Cup: 2021

References

External links

1985 births
Living people
Sportspeople from Bitola
Macedonian male handball players
S.L. Benfica handball players
RK Vardar players
FC Porto handball players
Expatriate handball players
Macedonian expatriate sportspeople in Portugal
Macedonian expatriate sportspeople in Romania